Paracanthobrama guichenoti is a species of cyprinid fish endemic to China.  It is the only member of its genus.

Named in honor of Antoine Alphone Guichenot (1809-1876), assistant naturalist at Musée du Jardin des Plantes a Paris.

References
 

Cyprinid fish of Asia
Freshwater fish of China
Taxa named by Pieter Bleeker
Fish described in 1864